Robert Ally Haak (March 26, 1916 – November 1, 1992) was an American football player.

Early life
Haak graduated from Hammond High School in Hammond, Indiana where he was a two-time state champion heavy-weight wrestler and an all-conference tackle.  He went on to Indiana University where he was a member of the football team, wrestling team, and Sigma Pi fraternity.  In 1937, he placed third in the Unlimited division at the NCAA Wrestling championships.  During his senior year at Indiana he was named to the all-Big Ten team and played in the 1939 Blue–Gray Football Classic All-Star game.  He earned his Bachelor of Science degree in Education.

Pro career
He played Guard and Tackle for the Brooklyn Dodgers in 1939.

Professional life
After leaving the NFL he spent 1940 as the line coach for the Indiana Hoosiers freshmen football team.

In later life he owned the distributing company Best Beers of Bloomington.

He was inducted into the Indiana Wrestling Hall of Fame in 1970 and into the Indiana Football Hall of Fame in 1976.

References

1916 births
1992 deaths
American football guards
American football tackles
Brooklyn Dodgers (NFL) players
Indiana Hoosiers football players
People from Hammond, Indiana
Players of American football from Indiana
American wrestlers